Richard Aldous is a British historian and biographer.

Born in Essex, Aldous was educated at the University of Cambridge. In 2006 he was made head of school at the department of history and archives in UCD. Aldous wrote books about Malcolm Sargent, Harold Macmillan, a twin-biography about Benjamin Disraeli and William Gladstone, a  study of Ronald Reagan and Margaret Thatcher's political relationship, as well as a biography of Arthur M. Schlesinger Jr.
Since 2010 he is the Eugene Meyer Professor of British History and Literature at Bard College in New York. He is also a Contributing Editor for The American Interest.

Works
 Tunes Of Glory: The Life of Malcolm Sargent. Hutchinson 2001, .
 Macmillan, Eisenhower And The Cold War 2005, .
 The Lion and the Unicorn: Gladstone vs Disraeli. Hutchinson 2006, .
 Great Irish Speeches. Quercus, Dublin 2007, .
 Reagan and Thatcher. The Difficult Relationship. Hutchinson 2012, .
 Schlesinger: The Imperial Historian. W. W. Norton & Company, New York 2017, .
 Tony Ryan: Ireland's Aviator. Gill Books, 2013.

References

Year of birth missing (living people)
Living people
British historians